Rozdrażew is a village in Krotoszyn County, Greater Poland Voivodeship, in west-central Poland. It is the seat of the gmina (administrative district) called Gmina Rozdrażew.

The village has a population of 1,800.

References

Villages in Krotoszyn County